Charlie Huston is a novelist and TV writer. His twelve novels span several genres from crime to horror to science fiction. His books have been published in English by Ballentine, Del Rey, Mulholland and Orion, and translated into nine other languages.  He adapted his novel The Mystic Arts of Erasing All Signs of Death for HBO, and his novel Already Dead for HBO Max.  He has also written pilots for FX, FOX, Sony and Tomorrow Studios, served as a consulting producer for FOX's Gotham, and worked in several development rooms.  He is known for storytelling that focuses on character and relationships in richly detailed worlds that blend genres.

Career
Caught Stealing, along with Six Bad Things and Huston's fourth novel, A Dangerous Man, follow the lovable anti-hero, baseball-mad Henry Thompson, as he works his way through mistaken identity, his past, and a new life for himself.

He wrote the five volume contemporary vampire noir Joe Pitt Casebooks primarily while living in Manhattan, finishing the final book in the series after moving to California.

His four stand alone novels are The Shotgun Rule, The Mystic Arts of Erasing All Signs of Death, Sleepless, and Skinner.

In 2006, Huston joined the list of print authors who have written American comic books.  In April 2006, Marvel Comics launched Huston's reboot of the Marvel character Moon Knight. Huston wrote the first 12 issues of the series, concluding his run in December 2007. He also wrote the second Ultimates Annual issue in August 2006. Another long-form comics work was a Wolverine series, Wolverine: The Best There Is, with artist Juan José Ryp.

In January 2013, it was announced that Huston was working on the pilot for FX's adaption of the Powers comic series. Between 2017 and 2019, Huston was a writer and producer on the Fox TV series Gotham.

As of September 2022, Huston is developing and writing an original TV pilot titled Arcadia for Tomorrow Studios.

Bibliography

Henry Thompson
Caught Stealing (hc, 256 pages, Ballantine Books, 2004, ; sc, 288 pages, 2005)
Six Bad Things (sc, 305 pages, Ballantine Books, 2005)
A Dangerous Man (sc, 286 pages, Ballantine Books, 2006)

Joe Pitt Casebooks

Already Dead (sc, 288 pages, Del Rey Books, 2005)
No Dominion (sc, 272 pages, Del Rey Books, 2006)
Half the Blood of Brooklyn (sc, 223 pages, Del Rey Books, 2007)
Every Last Drop (sc, 252 pages, Del Rey Books, 2008)
My Dead Body (sc, 315 pages, Del Rey Books, 2009)

Other work

Novels
The Shotgun Rule (hc, 256 pages, Ballantine Books, 2007, ; sc, 272 pages, 2009)
The Mystic Arts of Erasing All Signs of Death (hc, 336 pages, Ballantine Books, 2009, ; sc, 352 pages, 2009)
Sleepless (hc, 368 pages, Ballantine Books, 2010, ; sc, 368 pages, 2010)
Skinner (hc, 400 pages, Mulholland Books, 2013, ; sc, 400 pages, 2014)

Comics
To date, the entirety of Huston's work in comics has been published by Marvel and its various imprints:
Moon Knight vol. 2 (with David Finch, Mico Suayan, Tomm Coker (#13), Javier Saltares and Mark Texeira; issues #14–19 are scripted by Mike Benson from Huston's plots, 2006–2008) collected as:
The Bottom (collects #1–6, hc, 152 pages, 2007, ; tpb, 2007)
Midnight Sun (collects #7–13, hc, 224 pages, 2008, ; tpb, 2008)
God and Country (collects #14–19, hc, 184 pages, 2008, ; tpb, 2008)
Moon Knight by Huston, Benson and Hurwitz Omnibus (includes #1–19, hc, 1,184 pages, 2022)
The Ultimates 2 Annual #2 (with Mike Deodato, Jr. and Ryan Sook, Ultimate Marvel, 2006) collected in Ultimate Annuals Volume 2 (tpb, 160 pages, 2006)
Legion of Monsters: Man-Thing: "A Flower in Alien Soil" (with Klaus Janson, one-shot, 2007) collected in Legion of Monsters (hc, 280 pages, 2007)
X-Force Special: Ain't No Dog (with Jefte Palo, one-shot, 2008) collected in X-Force by Craig Kyle and Chris Yost Volume 1 (tpb, 384 pages, 2014)
Deadpool vol. 2 #900: "One Down" (with Kyle Baker, co-feature, 2009) collected in Deadpool: Dead Head Redemption (tpb, 240 pages, 2011)
Shang-Chi, Master of Kung Fu: Black and White: "The  of Memory" (with Enrique Badía Romero, anthology one-shot, 2009)
Punisher (Marvel MAX):
The Punisher: Frank Castle #75: "Smallest Bit of This" (with Ken Lashley, co-feature, 2009) collected in Punisher MAX: The Complete Collection Volume 5 (tpb, 504 pages, 2017)
Punisher MAX: Hot Rods of Death: "Getting Mad" (with Shawn Martinbrough, one-shot, 2010) collected in Punisher MAX: The Complete Collection Volume 6 (tpb, 376 pages, 2017)
Deathlok vol. 3 #1–7 (with Lan Medina, Marvel Knights, 2010) collected as Deathlok: The Demolisher (hc, 176 pages, 2010, ; tpb, 2011)
Bullseye: Perfect Game #1–2 (with Shawn Martinbrough, Marvel Knights, 2011) collected in Punisher and Bullseye: Deadliest Hits (tpb, 120 pages, 2017)
Wolverine: The Best There Is #1–12 (with Juan José Ryp, 2011–2012) collected as Wolverine: The Best There Is—The Complete Series (tpb, 288 pages, 2013)

References

External links

21st-century American novelists
American comics writers
American crime fiction writers
American fantasy writers
American horror writers
American male novelists
American thriller writers
Year of birth missing (living people)
Living people
21st-century American male writers